is a former Japanese football player.

Playing career
Sadatomi was born in Tokyo on July 5, 1979. After graduating from high school, he joined J1 League club Bellmare Hiratsuka (later Shonan Bellmare) in 1998. Although he played several matches as defensive midfielder every season from 1999, he could not play many matches. In 2002, he moved to J2 League club Montedio Yamagata. In 2003, he moved to Regional Leagues club Okinawa Kariyushi FC and played 2 seasons. In 2005, he moved to Yokohama FC. In 2006, he moved to Arte Takasaki and played as regular player. In 2007, he moved to Regional Leagues club AC Nagano Parceiro. He played as regular player in 2 seasons and retired end of 2008 season.

Club statistics

References

External links

geocities.co.jp

1979 births
Living people
Association football people from Tokyo
Japanese footballers
J1 League players
J2 League players
Japan Football League players
Shonan Bellmare players
Montedio Yamagata players
Yokohama FC players
Arte Takasaki players
AC Nagano Parceiro players
Association football midfielders